The Miller's Farm Covered Bridge was a covered bridge constructed by Elias McMellen in 1871.  The bridge was located in Lancaster County, Pennsylvania.  In 1962, the bridge's remaining parts along with timbers from Daniel Good's Fording Covered Bridge were used in the construction of the Willow Hill Covered Bridge .

References 

Covered bridges in Lancaster County, Pennsylvania
Bridges completed in 1871
Road bridges in Pennsylvania
Wooden bridges in Pennsylvania